The 2002 AFF Championship, officially known as the 2002 Tiger Cup, was co-hosted by Indonesia and Singapore from November 2002 to 13 January 2003 and participated by all national teams of the member associations of the ASEAN Football Federation entered except for Brunei.  The championship started off with group matches, where the top two teams from each group advanced to the semi-finals and the final.

In the final match between Thailand and Indonesia, Thailand took a 2–0 lead against hosts Indonesia by the end of the first half. However, the Indonesians battled back to level the score and force the game into a penalty shootout, which was won 4–2 by the Thais.

Venues

Squads

Tournament

Group stage

Group A 

 Times are Western Indonesian Time /(WIB) – UTC+7
 Matches played in Jakarta, Indonesia

Group B 

 Times are Singapore Standard Time (SST) – UTC+8
 Matches played in Singapore

Knockout stage 

 Times are Western Indonesian Time (WIT) – UTC+7
 Matches played in Jakarta, Indonesia

Semi-finals

Third place play-off

Final

Awards

Goalscorers 

8 goals
  Bambang Pamungkas

6 goals
  Zaenal Arif
  Lê Huỳnh Đức

4 goals
  Indra Putra Mahayuddin
  Worrawoot Srimaka

3 goals
  Hok Sochetra
  Visay Phaphouvanin
  Lwin Oo
  Kiatisuk Senamuang
  Huỳnh Hồng Sơn
  Trần Trường Giang

2 goals
  Ung Kanyanith
  Budi Sudarsono
  Sugiantoro
  Akmal Rizal Ahmad Rakhli
  Aung Kyaw Moe
  Zaw Zaw
  Zaw Htaik
  Tint Naing Tun Thein
  Mohd Noor Ali
  Therdsak Chaiman
  Nguyễn Minh Phương
  Trịnh Xuân Thành
  Đặng Phương Nam

1 goal
  Gendut Doni Christiawan
  Yaris Riyadi
  Imran Nahumarury
  Mohd Nizaruddin Yusof
  Mohd Nizam Jamil
  Tengku Hazman Raja Hassan
  Htay Aung
  Soe Lin Tun
  Richard Cañedo
  Ali Go
  Alfredo Razon Gonzalez
  Noh Alam Shah
  Chukiat Noosarung

1goal
  Narongchai Vachiraban
  Manit Noywech
  Sakda Joemdee
  Nguyễn Quốc Trung
  Phạm Văn Quyến
  Phan Văn Tài Em

1 own goal
  Solomon Licuanan (against Indonesia)

Team statistics
This table will show the ranking of teams throughout the tournament.

References

Further reading 
 Burkert, Sturmius; Courtney, Barrie. "ASEAN ("Tiger") Cup 2002 (Indonesia and Singapore)". RSSSF. Retrieved 8 March 2010.
 "Tiger Cup 2002". AseanFootball.org. ASEAN Football Federation. Retrieved 8 March 2010.

 
AFF Championship tournaments
AFF Championship, 2002
International association football competitions hosted by Singapore
International association football competitions hosted by Indonesia
2002 in Singaporean football
2002–03 in Indonesian football